The episodes of 07-Ghost were created by Studio DEEN. Directed by Nobuhiro Takamoto, the anime premiered on Chiba TV on April 7, 2009. The series uses two pieces of theme music. "Aka no Kakera" by Yuuki Suzuki is the opening theme, while "Hitomi no Kotae" by Noria is the ending theme.

Episode list

References

07 Ghost